Thank You is the debut extended play by Ukrainian recording artist Jamala. It was released on 1 October 2014 in Ukraine through Moon Records Ukraine and includes the single "Заплуталась".

Singles
"Заплуталась" was released as the lead and only single from the album on 25 September 2014.

Track listing

Release history

References

External links
 Official website
 album Thank You

Jamala albums
2014 EPs